U6 snRNA-associated Sm-like protein LSm7 is a protein that in humans is encoded by the LSM7 gene.

Function 

Sm-like proteins were identified in a variety of organisms based on sequence homology with the Sm protein family (see SNRPD2; MIM 601061). Sm-like proteins contain the Sm sequence motif, which consists of 2 regions separated by a linker of variable length that folds as a loop. The Sm-like proteins are thought to form a stable heteromer present in tri-snRNP particles, which are important for pre-mRNA splicing.[supplied by OMIM]

Interactions 

LSM7 has been shown to interact with TACC1 and LSM2.

References

Further reading